LTU International Airways, usually shortened to LTU and legally incorporated as LTU Lufttransport-Unternehmen GmbH, was a German leisure airline headquartered in Düsseldorf. It operated medium and long-haul routes and maintained hubs in Düsseldorf, Munich and Berlin-Tegel. LTU was acquired by Air Berlin in 2007. Use of the LTU brand ceased in 2009, and LTU itself was dissolved by April 2011.

History

Early years
LTU was established in May 1955 as Lufttransport Union and started operations in Frankfurt. It adopted its present name in 1956 when it operated charter flights. The initials LTU stand for the German phrase LuftTransport-Unternehmen which translates to "air transport enterprise". LTU had been headquartered in Düsseldorf since 1961. Over the years, LTU rose to become one of the biggest and most renowned German leisure time airlines and operated worldwide charter flights from many German airports, but mainly from its traditional main hub at Düsseldorf.

In 1983, a new subsidiary based in Munich called LTS was founded, which had a similar livery, but with blue instead of red. It was rebranded as LTU Süd in 1987 and got a new livery closer to the familiar red LTU livery. In 1998 LTU Süd was dissolved and completely incorporated into LTU. LTU also operated sister companies in Spain (LTE, 1987 - 2001) and Austria (LTU Austria, 2004 - 2008). Their traditional red and white livery barely changed over the years, thus becoming a recognizable trademark in the German charter flight business.

Also in 1983, LTU was featured in the music video for the Wham! song Club Tropicana featuring George Michael and Andrew Ridgeley as air crew members on holiday in Ibiza.

In 1991, LTU acquired overall four new McDonnell Douglas MD-11 as the first and sole German passenger operator. They handed them over to Swissair in 1998. 

The airline was owned by March 2007 by Intro Verwaltungsgesellschaft (55%) and Marbach Beteiligung und Consulting (45%) and had 2,892 employees before the Air Berlin merger.

Takeover by Air Berlin
In March 2007, Air Berlin took over LTU, creating the fourth-largest airline group in Europe in terms of traffic. Combined, the airlines carried 22.1 million passengers in 2006. The takeover was driven by the prospect of branching into long-haul operations and the chance to establish a stronger presence at Düsseldorf Airport. For a period, LTU retained its name on its leisure routes, while routes to the United States and China immediately switched to Air Berlin branding.

In May 2007, LTU presented its new livery. It maintained the traditional red and white corporate colors, but refreshed the overall appearance with smoother lines and overall more white. The new design was first applied to LTU's then new twelfth long-haul aircraft, an Airbus A330-200. This livery was later adapted to become the new Air Berlin design.

On 1 May 2007, LTU operated the first Arctic & North Pole Sightseeing Flight from continental Europe in aviation history for their charter contractor Deutsche Polarflug. The flight took 12h 55m and the aircraft, an A330-200 took a group of 283 passengers from Düsseldorf via Norway, Svalbard, The North Pole, Eastern Greenland and Iceland back to Düsseldorf.  The flight was filmed for an episode of PilotsEYE.tv. 

LTU opened a third long-haul base besides Düsseldorf and Munich at Berlin Tegel Airport in October 2007, basing a single Airbus A330-200 there to launch flights to Bangkok, Punta Cana and Varadero.

Cessation 
Air Berlin announced in 2008 that the trademark LTU would no longer be used. All flights were rebranded as Air Berlin. The last known flight under LTU callsign, but already in Air Berlin livery, was on 13 October 2009 from Montreal to Düsseldorf. As of April 2011, the AOC of LTU had been expired and the company itself was dissolved. On 27 October 2017, Air Berlin themselves ceased operations.

Destinations

Before being taken over by Air Berlin, LTU served 56 destinations in 22 countries on four continents during winter schedule season 2006–2007. Further destinations were available with codeshare partner Bangkok Airways.

Fleet
During its existence, LTU operated the following aircraft, including the fleet incorporated into Air Berlin by March 2007:

References

External links

Official website (Archive)
LTU  (Archive)

Defunct airlines of Germany
Companies based in Düsseldorf
Airlines established in 1955
Airlines disestablished in 2009
1955 establishments in West Germany
German companies established in 1955
German companies disestablished in 2009